Christopher Branch is a British film maker. He is perhaps best known for producing Academy Award winning documentary film The Lady in Number 6.  he is producing Definition of Fear, starring Jacqueline Fernandez.

Filmography

References

External links

Year of birth missing (living people)
Living people
British film producers